Eupithecia fletcheri is a moth in the  family Geometridae. It is found in India and Pakistan.

References

Moths described in 1926
fletcheri
Moths of Asia